Tai Wei Yuan, the Supreme Palace Enclosure (太微垣), is one of the San Yuan or Three enclosures. Stars and constellations of this group are visible during spring in the Northern Hemisphere (autumn in the Southern).

Asterisms

The asterisms are :

Map

See also 

 Twenty-eight mansions

Chinese constellations